The Central Yunnan Water Diversion Project is a large-scale civil engineering project under construction that will allow water from the Jinsha River near Lijiang to be transported to Central Yunnan. The total length of the water channels will be , of which  will be in tunnels.

The project has a cost of US$ 12.03 billion, largely funded by the Ministry of Water Resources. It is planned for completion by 2026.

Background 

Central Yunnan is a dry region of China, where currently only  of water is available per capita annually, compared to a  recommended minimum. At the same time, Central Yunnan accounts for 68% of Yunnan's GDP. The region has suffered from long drought spells, such as a period of 30 months without heavy rains in Kunming. Water scarcity has been described as "biggest bottleneck restricting the sustainable development of Central Yunnan." The idea of diverting water from the Jinsha River to Central Yunnan was first proposed by Yunnan's vice-governor Zhang Chong in the 1950s.

The water diversion project was included in the Thirteenth Five-Year Plan. In April 2017, it was approved by the State Council.

Construction 
The project will include the world's longest water tunnel, the world's largest underground pump room and largest pump capacity in Asia. In addition it deals with challenging geological conditions, due to passing through a number of faults. It crosses the four major watersheds of Yunnan: that of the Jinsha River, Mekong, Red River and Nanpan River, as well as crossing the Hengduan Mountains in northwest Yunnan.

Construction commenced on 4 August 2017, with a planned construction time of 8 years.

Impact 
Over  billion of water would be transported through the channels annually by 2040. This water will be used for domestic and industrial water supply ( million),   agricultural water supply ( million), as well as for improving the ecology of lakes in the region ( million).

Since the inlet at the Jinsha River does not include a dam structure, the impact on the source river is expected to be small.

The project is seen as a demonstration project for a future Tibet to Xinjiang water diversion project.

See also 

 South–North Water Transfer Project, series of projects diverting water from the Yangtze river to the north of China

External links 

 Official website

References 

Aqueducts in China
Irrigation in China
Megaprojects
Macro-engineering